ROMS may refer to:

Ringgit Operations Monitoring System, an FX market regulatory reporting system owned and operated by Bank Negara Malaysia, the central bank of Malaysia.
The Roma people
"ROMs" is also the plural of ROM
Royal Oak Middle School
Russian Organization for Multimedia and Digital Systems
Regional Ocean Modeling System